Achala Fort is a westernmost fort in the Satmala hill range. It is located 55km from Nashik, in Nashik district, of Maharashtra. This fort is adjoining the Ahivant Fort. The three forts Achala, Ahivant, and Mohandar are very close by. The Achala and Mohandar forts were constructed to guard the Ahivant fort. Captain Briggs has described it as a large hill, whose ascent is very easy till it reaches the top where it is very steep.

History
In 1636 this fort was under the control of Adilshah. The Moghul Emperor Shahjahan send one of his General Shaista Khan and entrusted to win all the forts in Nashik region. Alivardikhan was cavalier of Shaista Khan who won the Fort. In 1670 king Shivaji Maharaj won the fort from Moghuls. The Moghul Emperor Aurangzeb sent his chieftain Mahabat Khan to win the fort. Mahabat Khan and DilerKhan opened battle front from either side of the fort. The attack was so fierce that the Ahivant fort was surrendered to Moghuls. Subsequently, the Achala fort was also surrendered. In 1818 the fort was surrendered to Colonel Briggs along with other 17 forts after the fall of Trymbak fort.

How to reach
The nearest town is Vani which is 44 km from Nashik. The base village of the fort is Dagad Pimpri which is 13km from Vani. There are good hotels at Vani. The trekking path starts from the hillock north of the Dagad Pimpri. The route is very safe and wide. There are no trees on the trekking route. It takes about one hour to reach the col between the two forts. The right path goes to Ahivant fort and the left path goes to Achala fort. The night stay on the fort cannot be made due to lack of potable water on the fort. The villagers from the local village make night stay and food arrangements at a reasonable cost. The other route is from Daregaon.

Places to see
The Achala fort is occupied on a small hill. There are few ruins of buildings, store houses and water tanks that can be seen on the fort. It takes about half an hour to encircle the fort.

See also 
 List of forts in Maharashtra
 List of forts in India
 Shaista Khan
 Marathi People
 List of Maratha dynasties and states
 Maratha War of Independence
 Battles involving the Maratha Empire
 Maratha Army
 Maratha titles
 Military history of India
 List of people involved in the Maratha Empire

References 

Buildings and structures of the Maratha Empire
Forts in Nashik district
16th-century forts in India
Hiking trails in India